Slope Day is an annual day of celebration held at Cornell University historically during the last day of regular undergraduate classes, but has moved to the following day as of 2014. The Slope Day Programming Board (SDPB) is responsible for organizing the event, selecting artists, and managing the Slope Day's execution. Though Slope Day has gone through many phases, in recent years focus has shifted to live music and catered food and beverages on the Slope.

History of Slope Day
Slope Day's origins can be traced to 1890, when the annual Navy Ball began on the Cornell University campus. The Navy Ball, held in October on the day before a major regatta on Cayuga Lake, was an evening dance with a band for the purpose of raising funds to support the Cornell crew and other athletic programs. Students traditionally skipped classes on the day of the regatta following the ball. In 1901, the Navy Ball was moved from October to May for the first time, and a committee including John L. Senior, Willard Straight, and Henry Schoellkopf arranged the event and entertainment. Attendance in classes on the following day was dismal, and in 1902, the university declared the following day a holiday called Spring Day. The annual Spring Day festivities involved a wide range of activities, from mock bullfights to circuses, typically on the Arts Quad. Spring Day remained a Cornell tradition for over 50 years. However, during the 1960s and 1970s, official Spring Day celebrations were considered an anachronism, as Cornell was in the midst of Vietnam-era protests and civil unrest.

A brief revival occurred in the spring of 1971.  The Sunshine Memorial Festival was organized by a Cornell student group, Ithaca Rapid Transit. It was sponsored by Maxwell’s Coffee House, a student-run coffee house (founded by Daniel Vlock ’74 in 1971 in the freshman dormitory Mary Donlon Hall) and Noyes Center. Maxwell’s was the first coffee house in North Campus and was named after a dog housed in the dormitory and not the Beatles song.

For the concert a plywood stage was constructed at the base of Libe Slope.  The speaker system was provided by Cornell Engineering School students and was powered by extension cords plugged into outlets in student dormitory rooms.  Several local bands played for free.  The best known was Boffalongo.  Boffalongo subsequently became King Harvest and were known for their hit song “Dancing in the Moonlight”.  An estimated 5,000 people attended. Music and dancing took place until midnight when the Cornell Safety Patrol turned off the electricity. Two additional Sunshine Memorial Festival events were planned for the Spring and Fall of 1972. However, as is typical for Ithaca weather, they were rained out.

In 1979, an event then called "Springfest" was held on the last day of classes. Cornell Dining sponsored a chicken barbecue on Libe Slope and served beer to the students. At the time, New York State's drinking age was 18, making it easy for the university to sponsor both food and alcohol service for the event. For the next six years, Springfest involved live bands playing at the base of Libe Slope, with students dancing and drinking on the Slope itself.  In December 1985, New York state raised the drinking age to 21, so University officials announced that the 1986 Springfest would be held in a fenced-in area on North Campus instead of the Slope.  The student body responded with a massive "Take Back the Slope" campaign. All across campus, T-shirts, signs and chalk on sidewalks beckoned students to boycott the official Springfest and "Take Back the Slope."  They did by the thousands, and the name "Slope Day" replaced "Springfest."  In 1987, the University caved to pressure and had Robert Cray play on the Slope, but by 1988 the bands were gone once again and Slope Day became an unofficial event. For the next decade or so, the University tolerated Slope Day, and took little action to control it except for the banning of beer kegs in 1991.  For many students the focus of Slope Day became the consumption of excessive amounts of alcohol. 

Starting in the mid-1990s, the University began a more gradual reining in of Slope Day, instead of repeating the failed strategy of regaining control all at once. SlopeFest, an alcohol-free event featuring carnival-style entertainment started to take place on West Campus in 1999. In 2001, the amount and type of alcohol students could bring onto the slope was limited.  Starting in 2003, the Slope Day Steering Committee (initially organized as the President's Council on Alcohol and Other Drugs by president-emeritus Hunter S. Rawlings III) took charge of Slope Day, restricted access to Libe Slope, brought live entertainment, and provided catered food and drink service.  This time, the University's assertion of control succeeded.

The students did not revolt as their predecessors had done in the late 1980s, leading to increased University prohibitions against drinking at the event.

Recent Slope Day measures have tried to limit excess underage drinking. Bracelets with tabs that are used as tickets to purchase alcohol are only offered to those who are of age, and only one drink is sold per purchase. Free water has been handed out to all attendees since 2006, and several volunteers on the slope have supervised students.

Current Slope Day Activities

In the fall of 2003 the Slope Day Programming Board was created by the Cornell University Student Assembly (SA), under the leadership of SA president Justin Fishbone, to lead the planning of social and recreational activities on Slope Day.  The Slope Day Programming Board (SDPB) has an open membership policy for all undergraduate and graduate students at Cornell, and it works closely with university administrators and the Slope Day Steering Committee.  The SDPB aims to create a fun and safe celebration for the entire Cornell community. Recently, access to these activities on Libe Slope and Ho Plaza and at nearby campus locations has been restricted to Cornell students, faculty, and staff, as well as selected guests.

Music
Live musical performances are typically held during Slope Day.
Past live performances included:
 May 1920: Sherbo's Orchestra
 May 2, 1924:  Dave Harman and his Orchestra
May 1928: R. Matthew Freeman and The Oarsmen
1934: Kevin McHale's Shrimpers
 May 1940: Glenn Miller
 1947: Duke Ellington
 May 16, 1953: Charlie Spivak, Skitch Henderson
 May 15, 1954: Johnny Long, Jerry Gray
 Friday, May 6, 1977: Commander Cody and His Lost Planet Airmen (Held on Libe Slope) this was the start of the new Slope Day or Springfest
 Sunday, May 8, 1977: The Grateful Dead (in Barton Hall) This concert was separate from the Slope Day. It is notable for being one of the most famous and enduring recorded Grateful Dead concerts. Like all recorded performances of the Grateful Dead, it is free to download and distribute, and it is the second-most-downloaded Grateful Dead concert on the Internet Archive.
 May 1981: The B Willie Smith Band
 May 1984: The Ramones, Harold Melvin & the Blue Notes  (Held in Barton Hall due to inclement weather)
 May 1985: Southside Johnny and the Asbury Jukes
 May 9, 1986: The Del Fuegos. Because New York had raised the drinking age from 18 to 21 in December 1985, the event was moved to a fenced-off area on Helen Newman / Mary Donlon fields to try to control underage alcohol consumption. 
 May 1987: Robert Cray's performance was moved back to the traditional Libe Slope location.
 May 5, 2000: Pilfers
 May 4, 2001: Stroke 9
 May 3, 2002: Nada Surf
 May 2, 2003: Rusted Root, Fat Joe
 May 7, 2004: Kanye West, O.A.R., Dilated Peoples, Matt Nathanson (did not play)
 May 6, 2005: Snoop Dogg, The Game, The Starting Line
 May 5, 2006: Ben Folds, Talib Kweli, Acceptance
 May 4, 2007: T.I., TV on the Radio, Catch 22
 May 2, 2008: Ted Leo and the Pharmacists, Gym Class Heroes, Hot Hot Heat
 May 1, 2009: Pussycat Dolls, Asher Roth, and The Apples in Stereo

 May 7, 2010: Drake, Francis & The Lights, and k-os
 May 6, 2011: Nelly, Ra Ra Riot, The Cool Kids
 May 4, 2012: Taio Cruz, Neon Trees, The Wailers
 May 3, 2013: Kendrick Lamar, Hoodie Allen, 5 & A Dime
 May 8, 2014: Ludacris, Matt and Kim, 3LAU
 May 7, 2015: Chance the Rapper, Magic!
 May 12, 2016: Walk the Moon, Cash Cash, R. City
 May 11, 2017:  Big Gigantic, MisterWives, Brasstracks, S'natra
 May 10, 2018: Galantis, Young Bombs, Dreezy
May 8, 2019: Steve Aoki, Cousin Stizz, EZI
May 14&15, 2020: KYLE, A Boogie wit da Hoodie, Swae Lee, Rico Nasty, Matoma
May 11, 2022: Aminé (rapper), Loud Luxury, Luna Li

SlopeFest
SlopeFest is a carnival type event accompanying Slope Day. In the past, this event has included various raffles, an airbrush tattoo artist and inflatable games. Started in 1999 by concerned students of the Slope Day Programming Board, SlopeFest was held on West Campus and hosted carnival-style games, food, and live musical performances. Starting in 2004, SlopeFest was incorporated into the main events of Slope Day and held inside the event perimeter. SlopeFest is now held on Ho Plaza.  The Slope Day Programming Board, composed of students, plans all aspects of SlopeFest.

References

External links
 Official Slope Day Webpage
 A History of Slope Day from the Cornell Alumni Magazine
 A time-lapse movie of the 2001 Slope Day
 A History of Slope Day from the Cornell Daily Sun
inflatable games

Cornell University
Drinking culture